

St. Joseph's Indian Normal School is a former school for American Indians in Rensselaer, Indiana. The school building is now known as Drexel Hall and part of the Saint Joseph's College campus. Boarding schools were believed to be the best way to assimilate them into the white culture. The school lasted from 1888 to 1896 and was funded by the U.S. government and Catholic missionaries.  It was believed that this was the best way to "civilize" Native Americans and the western territories.  Established by the Catholic Indian Missions with funding from St. Katharine Drexel, the school taught 60 Indian children.  The Society of Precious Blood operated the school during its years of operation.  The students were all boys. When the Indian School was closed, the building was named Drexel Hall.  It is one of the first structures of Saint Joseph's College.

The Indian school was essentially a red brick structure with the ground floor surrounded with a sandstone wall. It was built in a square,  on each side. Each wing had four floors with the east wing only three floors high. The roof was red tiles. The main entrance was on the west. It was owned by the Bureau of Catholic Indian Missions in Washington, D.C.

It was a boarding school for Indian boys with space for 70 boys, their classrooms, playroom, dormitory, kitchen, a small chapel, rooms for the superintendent and a teacher or two and for around six Sisters (nuns) who ran the kitchen. An inspector's report said there were 29 rooms in all. Although the building served as an Indian school for only eight years (1888-1896), it was not changed or altered until 1937 when it was re-modeled to serve as a residence hall for Saint Joseph's College. Only the bell tower was removed along with the shutters from the windows. On the inside, it was altered.  The courtyard was made smaller to allow an extra row of rooms. Drexel Hall later housed some offices of Saint Joseph's College, before and after the college announced a suspension of operations in 2017.

Significance
 It represents a time when the country hoped to solve the Indian question by off-reservation schools.  Here Indian pupils would be assimilated into white man's culture.  The boys would then convert their own people when they returned home 
 It was designed in imitation of the Carlisle Indian school of Carlisle, Pennsylvania, founded nine years earlier
 It was a "contract" school, i.e., one of the many private schools once supported by an annual federal per pupil subsidy to promote Indian education, therefore a relic of an era of state-church partnership now largely forgotten 
 It was the only Catholic off-reservation school of this type 
 It was one of only two such Indian schools in the state of Indiana, the other being White's Manual Labor Institute at Wabash, Indiana, also a "contract school" of the Society of Friends

Bibliography
Four articles in the Rensselaer Republican: May 11, May 18, May 25 and June 1, 1971, marking the 75th anniversary of the closing of the Indian school.

See also
 Carlisle Indian Industrial School

References

External links

Native American history of Indiana
Native American boarding schools
School buildings on the National Register of Historic Places in Indiana
National Register of Historic Places in Jasper County, Indiana
Buildings and structures in Jasper County, Indiana
Schools founded by St. Katharine Drexel
Schools founded by missionaries
Saint Joseph's College (Indiana)